The Sun Also Rises is a 1926 Ernest Hemingway novel.

It may also refer to:

Adaptations of the Hemingway novel
 The Sun Also Rises (1957 film), an adaptation directed by Henry King
 The Sun Also Rises (1984 film), an adaptation directed by James Goldstone
 The Sun Also Rises (opera), a 2000 adaptation by Webster A. Young
 The Select (The Sun Also Rises), a 2011 stage adaptation by Elevator Repair Service

Music
 The Sun Also Rises (duo), a folk music duo formed in the late 1960s
 "The Sun Also Rises", a 2003 song by Brave Saint Saturn from The Light of Things Hoped For
 The Sun Also Rises, a 2019 album by Fish Leong

Film & television
 The Sun Also Rises (2007 film), a film by Jiang Wen unrelated to the above Hemingway novel
 "The Sun Also Rises" (The Vampire Diaries), an episode of the television series The Vampire Diaries

See also 
 The Son Also Rises (disambiguation)